Alan Skinner may refer to:

 Alan Skinner (cricketer) (1913–1982), English cricketer
 Alan Skinner (rugby union) (born 1942), Australian rugby union player
 J. Allen Skinner (1890–1974), British trade unionist and pacifist